50 Newton Street is a Grade II listed former warehouse in Manchester, England. Located on Newton Street in the Northern Quarter area, it was built in 1906-8 by a design from Charles Clegg & Son. It was designed with a degree of flair and panache and is described by English Heritage as an example of "Free Baroque" architecture. The hat factory it replaced was destroyed by fire in 1906.

See also

Listed buildings in Manchester-M1

References

External links

Grade II listed buildings in Manchester
Grade II listed industrial buildings
Industrial buildings completed in 1900
Baroque Revival architecture
Art Nouveau architecture in Manchester
Art Nouveau commercial buildings